Patrice Canayer (born 4 April 1961) is a French handball coach and former player. He was a player-coach for 6 years in Paris-Asnières. He has been the head coach of Montpellier Handball since 1994.

Achievements

As coach 

 EHF Champions League: (2) 2003, 2018
 LNH Division 1: (14) 1995, 1998, 1999, 2000, 2002, 2003, 2004, 2005, 2006, 2008, 2009, 2010, 2011, 2012
 Coupe de France: (13) 1999, 2000, 2001, 2002, 2003, 2005, 2006, 2008, 2009, 2010, 2012, 2013, 2016
 Coupe de la Ligue: (10) 2004, 2005, 2006, 2007, 2008, 2010, 2011, 2012, 2014, 2016

Individual awards 

 All-Star Team as Best Coach in EHF Champions League: 2018
 Voted Best Coach in LNH Division 1: 2002, 2003, 2006, 2008, 2010, 2012, 2015, 2018

References

1961 births
Living people
French male handball players
French handball coaches